Phtheochroa hydnum is a species of moth of the family Tortricidae. It is found in Chihuahua, Mexico.

References

Moths described in 1991
Phtheochroa